"Sex, Love & Water" is a song by Dutch DJ and record producer Armin van Buuren. It features the vocals from Australian singer-songwriter Conrad Sewell. The song was released by Armada Music as a digital download on 2 February 2018. The song was written by van Buuren, Sewell, Angel Lopez, Scott Storch, Fiora Cutler, and Charles Edward Treece, and it was produced by van Buuren, Lopez, and Storch.

Track listing
Digital download
"Sex, Love & Water" – 3:17

Digital download – extended mix
"Sex, Love & Water" (extended mix) – 5:54

Digital download – club mix
"Sex, Love & Water" (club mix) – 2:45

Charts

Weekly charts

Year-end charts

References

2018 singles
Armin van Buuren songs
Conrad Sewell songs
2018 songs
Songs written by Armin van Buuren
Songs written by Scott Storch
Songs written by Conrad Sewell
Armada Music singles